Batysh Salieva (1922-2015) was a Soviet-Kyrgyzstani Politician (Communist).

She served as Minister of Social Security in 1953–1966 and 1973–1985.

References

1922 births
2015 deaths
20th-century Kyrgyzstani women politicians
20th-century Kyrgyzstani politicians
Soviet women in politics
Kyrgyzstani communists
Women government ministers of Kyrgyzstan